Alessio Galasso (born 29 May 1974) is a French rugby player.

Galasso was born in Dakar, Senegal. He played for Toulon, Montferrand, Bath Rugby, Castres and SU Agen at prop. He earned his first cap with the French national team on 7 April 2001 against Romania.

Honour
 Coupe de France 2001 with AS Montferrand
 Challenge Yves du Manoir 2001 with AS Montferrand
 Top 14 2001, finalist with AS Montferrand

External links
 ESPN profile

1974 births
Living people
French rugby union players
Rugby union props
France international rugby union players